The Gorner Glacier is a valley glacier found on the west side of the Monte Rosa massif close to Zermatt in the canton of Valais, Switzerland. Numerous smaller glaciers connect with the Gorner Glacier. Its (former) tributaries are (clockwise on this map): Gornergletscher (after which the whole system is named, but the upper part is now disconnected from the lower part), Monte Rosa Gletscher, Grenzgletscher (nowadays by far its main tributary, now disconnected from the actual Gornergletscher), Zwillingsgletscher, Schwärzegletscher, Breithorngletscher, Triftjigletscher, and Unterer Theodulgletscher (although the last three ones are actually disconnected now).

The Grenzgletscher between the central Monte Rosa massif and the Liskamm to the south is nowadays by far the lower Gorner Glacier's main tributary. The Gorner Glacier's upper part is almost already disconnected from its lower part. Also the former tributaries Breithorngletscher, Triftjigletscher, and Unterer Theodulgletscher lost their connections to the Gorner Glacier during the last century; the Lower Theodul Glacier became disconnected in the 1980s.

An interesting feature of this glacier is the Gornersee, an ice marginal lake at the confluence area of the Gorner- and Grenzgletscher. This lake fills every year and drains in summer, usually as a Glacial lake outburst flood. This is one of few  glacial lakes in the Alps exhibiting this kind of behavior.

There are also several interesting surface features including crevasses and "table top" forms where large surface boulders have been left stranded above the glaciers surface. These tabular rocks are supported by ice that the boulder has sheltered from melting that has effected the more exposed surrounding ice.

Due to the immense information about the glacier, it is perfect for a glacier project.

It is the source of the river , which flows down through Zermatt itself. However, most of its water is captured by a water catchment station of the Grande Dixence hydroelectric power plant. This water then ends up in the Lac des Dix, the main reservoir of Grande Dixence.

The glacier as well as the surrounding mountains can be seen from the Gornergrat, connected from Zermatt by the Gornergrat Railway.

Retreating glacier(s)
Like almost all other glaciers in the Alps, and most glaciers on the globe as well, due to global warming the Gorner Glacier is a retreating glacier—and in quite a dramatic way.

In these days ( 2015) this becomes quite obvious because the uneducated visitor usually misidentifies Gorner Glacier's main tributary as its upper part: the Grenzgletscher on the south side of the central, visible Monte Rosa massif. However, the upper Gorner Glacier traditionally is to be found on the north side. The reason is that the upper part of the Gorner Glacier is currently losing contact with its lower part and now the Grenzgletscher has become its much larger tributary. So it is easy to mismatch the Border Glacier as the upper Gorner Glacier.

But this was not the case in earlier times, as the following comparison impressively shows (be also aware of the retreating of the Monte Rosa Glacier in the middle, the one in between Gorner and Border Glaciers):

See also

List of glaciers in Switzerland
List of glaciers
Retreat of glaciers since 1850
Swiss Alps

References

External links
Gorner Glacier glaciology.ethz.ch
Gorner Glacier swisseduc.ch

Glaciers of Valais
Glaciers of the Alps